Self-testing code is software that incorporates built-in tests (see test-first development).

In Java, to execute a unit test from the command line, a class can have methods like the following.
// Executing <code>main</code> runs the unit test. 
public static void main(String[] args) {
    test();
}

static void test() {
    assert foo == bar;
}
To invoke a full system test, a class can incorporate a method call.
public static void main(String[] args) {
    test();
    TestSuite.test();    // invokes full system test
}In addition, Java has some Jupiter API libraries for self-testing code. assert can be used in various ways such as assert equals, which checks if the given variable is equal to the value given.@Test
void checkplayer() {
        Board board = new Board(10);
        board.addplayer(1);
        int check = board.getCurrentPlayer(1);
        assertEquals(1, check);

    }

See also
Software development
Extreme programming

References 

Articles with example Java code
Unit testing